André Morice (11 October 1900, Nantes – 17 January 1990) was a French politician. He represented the Radical Party in the Constituent Assembly elected in 1945, in the Constituent Assembly elected in 1946 and in the National Assembly from 1946 to 1958. He was Minister of National Education in 1950, Minister of Merchant Navy from 1951 to 1952, Minister of Public Works from 1952 to 1953, Minister of Commerce and Industry from 1955 to 1956 and Minister of Defence in 1957. He was the mayor of Nantes from 1965 to 1977.

References

1900 births
1990 deaths
Radical Party (France) politicians
French Ministers of National Education
French Ministers of Public Works
French Ministers of Commerce and Industry
French Ministers of Defence
French Ministers of Merchant Marine
Government ministers of France
Members of the Constituent Assembly of France (1945)
Members of the Constituent Assembly of France (1946)
Deputies of the 1st National Assembly of the French Fourth Republic
Deputies of the 2nd National Assembly of the French Fourth Republic
Deputies of the 3rd National Assembly of the French Fourth Republic
French Senators of the Fifth Republic
Senators of Loire-Atlantique
Mayors of Nantes
French military personnel of World War II